John Mackintosh may refer to:

 John Mackintosh (luthier) (–1840), Irish luthier and professor
 John MacKintosh (1790–1881), farmer and politician in Prince Edward Island
 John Mackintosh (historian) (1833–1907), Scottish historian
 John Mackintosh (philanthropist) (1865–1940), Gibraltarian businessman and philanthropist
 John Mackintosh (confectioner) (1868–1920), founder of the British confectionery company Mackintosh's
 John Mackintosh (Canadian politician) (1890–1965), Canadian provincial politician from Alberta
 John Mackintosh, 2nd Viscount Mackintosh of Halifax (1921–1980), British peer
 John Mackintosh (Scottish politician) (1929–1978), Scottish Labour politician
 John Mackintosh, 3rd Viscount Mackintosh of Halifax (born 1958), British peer

See also
 John Mackintosh Square, the main square in Gibraltar
 John Mackintosh Hall, the main cultural center in Gibraltar
 
 John McIntosh (disambiguation)